Ann-Maree Putney of New South Wales is a female Australian two-time World Champion ten-pin bowler. In 2009, she was elected to the World Bowling Writers International Bowling Hall of Fame. She competed for Australia for 26 years, winning a total of 30 medals in international competitions such as the World, Asian, and Commonwealth Championships. In 2019, she was inducted into the Tenpin Bowling Australia (TBA) Hall of Fame as well as the Hunter Region Sporting Hall of Fame. Her career spanned 34 years.  

Putney earned her first world title in the 1999 World Championships Masters crown in Abu Dhabi then the QubicaAMF Bowling World Cup in 2007 in St. Petersburg, Russia.  She also won bronze in the women's doubles world championships in Nevada in 2014 with Carol Gianotti.

Achievements

World Championships
 1999- World FIQ Tenpin Boling Championships, UAE - GOLD Masters Champion
 2003- World Team Challenge, Denmark - BRONZE Team
 2007 -Women's World Bowling Championships, Mexico – SILVER Medal Singles
 2007- Women's World Bowling Championships, Mexico – BRONZE Medal All Events
 2009 -Women's World Bowling Championships, USA – SILVER Medal Doubles
 2013 -Combined World Championships – BRONZE Medal Women's Doubles

Asian Championships
 1991- Asian Youth Tenpin Bowling Championship, Guam – GOLD Teams
 1994- Asian Tenpin Bowling Championship, Guam – SILVER Teams
 1998- Asian Tenpin Bowling Championship, Taiwan SILVER Teams
 2000- FIQ Team Asian Zone, Qatar – GOLD Doubles & BRONZE Masters
 2004- Asian Tenpin Championships Silver Medal Doubles & Silver Medal Masters

Commonwealth Championships
 2002- I Commonwealth Championships – GOLD, 3x SILVER & 2x BRONZE
 2005- II Commonwealth Championships – GOLD Singles & BRONZE Doubles, Mixed Teams & BRONZE Masters
 2006- III Commonwealth Championships – GOLD Singles, SILVER Mixed Doubles, Mixed Teams, Bronze Doubles & Silver Masters
 2013- IV Commonwealth Championships – GOLD Medal Mixed Doubles
 2013- IV Commonwealth Championships – BRONZE Medal Women's Doubles

QubicaAMF Bowling World Cup Results
 2007- Champion QubicaAMF Bowling World Cup, St Petersburg Russia
 2008- Runner Up QubicaAMF Bowling World Cup, Hermosillo Mexico

National Titles
 1994, 1998, 1999, 2001, 2007, 2011, 2012- Vic 150
 1994 & 2008- Australian Masters
 1999, 2004 & 2007- Adelaide Women's Cup
 2000, 2001, 2007 & 2008- South Pacific Champion
 2002, 2007, 2011 & 2013- NSW Open
 2004, 2005 & 2009- Queensland Ladies Cup
 2005 & 2008- K&K Classic
 2008- Melbourne International Tenpin Cup

Recognition
 2019 Induction to the Tenpin Bowling Australia (TBA) Hall of Fame 
 2019 Induction to the Hunter Region Sporting Hall of Fame
 2009- Induction to the World Bowling Writers Hall of Fame

Australian Team Representative Honors
 1991-2014- Australian Team Member Every Year

Achievements for the sport of tenpin bowling
 1989-2009- Australian Tenpin Bowling "All Stars" Team Member
 Rachuig Team member for 21 years and Team captain
 Prime Minister of Australia – "Letter of Congratulations"
 3x New South Wales Government – "Certificate of Recognition"
 4x Channel 10 Television – "Outstanding Contribution to Sport"

References

Living people
Year of birth missing (living people)
Australian ten-pin bowling players
Australian sportswomen